Danatinia casca is an extinct lamprid from Danata Formation Lagerstatten, of the Upper Paleocene of Turkmenistan. It was first named by Daniltshenko in 1968.

D. casca was sympatric with its close relative, Turkmene.  In life, it would have resembled a very small opah.

External links
 Danatania at the Paleobiology Database
 The first fossil ribbonfish (Teleostei, Lampridiformes, Trachipteridae) by Giorgio Carnevale, Istituto di Geoscienze e Georisorse, Pisa, Italy.

Turkmenidae